Radheshyam Biswas is a Bengali Indian politician and a member of parliament to the 16th Lok Sabha from Karimganj (Lok Sabha constituency), Assam. He won the 2014 Indian general election being an All India United Democratic Front candidate.  He lost the 2019 Indian General Election to a candidate from the BJP.

References

1954 births
Living people
India MPs 2014–2019
All India United Democratic Front politicians
Bengali Hindus
Lok Sabha members from Assam
People from Karimganj district
India MPs 2019–present